Powell Park is a  public park in southeast Portland, Oregon's Brooklyn neighborhood, in the United States. The space was acquired in 1921.

References

External links

 

1921 establishments in Oregon
Brooklyn, Portland, Oregon
Protected areas established in 1921